Sterky is a Swedish surname of Swiss origin that may refer to:
 Anna Sterky, a 19th-century Swedish Social Democrat and union organiser
 Fredrik Sterky, a 19th-century Swedish Social Democrat and union organiser

See also
 Styrbjörn Sterki, Styrbjörn the Strong
Victor Sterki

References